Myioscaptia is a genus of horse flies in the family Tabanidae.

Species
Myioscaptia bancrofti (Austen, 1912)
Myioscaptia calliphora (Mackerras, 1960)
Myioscaptia collessi (Lessard, 2013)
Myioscaptia ferromontana (Daniels, 2011)
Myioscaptia gibbula (Walker, 1848)
Myioscaptia inopinata (Fairchild & Mackerras, 1977)
Myioscaptia lambkinae (Lessard, 2013)
Myioscaptia muscula (English, 1955)
Myioscaptia nigroapicalis (Mackerras, 1960)
Myioscaptia nigrocincta (Mackerras, 1960)
Myioscaptia violacea (Macquart, 1850)

References

Tabanidae
Brachycera genera
Diptera of Australasia